Matthew Kenneth Rhule (born January 31, 1975) is an American football coach and former player who is the head coach of the Nebraska Cornhuskers. He was previously the head coach at Temple University, Baylor University, and  the Carolina Panthers of the National Football League (NFL) . He played as a linebacker for Penn State University.

Rhule was born and raised in New York City before moving to State College, Pennsylvania, where he would later join the Penn State football team as a walk-on under coach Joe Paterno. After a four-year playing career, Rhule began his first coaching job in 1998 as a volunteer assistant for Penn State. Later that year, he received his first positional job as the linebackers coach for Albright College. Between 1998 and 2007, Rhule coached several positions at various schools, including defensive line, special teams, and quarterback. In 2008, he became the offensive coordinator for Temple, a position he held for four years. Rhule worked his first NFL job as an assistant for the New York Giants in 2012.

In 2013, Rhule returned to Temple to become the team's head coach. In 2015, he led the Owls to their first 10-win season since 1979. He won 10 games again the next season, delivering the program its first American Athletic Conference title and first-ever back-to-back seasons with bowl appearances. He was hired as the head coach of Baylor following the 2016 regular season. In his first season with the Bears, the team finished 1–11 but improved to bowl eligibility the following year. In 2019, Rhule led Baylor to an 11–3 mark, including berths to the Big 12 Championship Game and the Sugar Bowl.

Rhule returned to the NFL in 2020 when he was hired to succeed Ron Rivera as head coach of the Carolina Panthers. Between his first two seasons at the helm, the Panthers won only 10 games total and lost 23. Carolina started the 2022 season at 1–4, resulting in the Panthers firing Rhule in October. The Panthers were 1-26 in games where the opponent scored 17 plus points. In November 2022, Rhule agreed to an eight-year contract with Nebraska to become the program's head coach.

Early years
Rhule grew up in New York City before his family moved to State College, Pennsylvania as a teenager. Rhule played linebacker at State College Area High School before walking on as a linebacker to Penn State. At Penn State, Rhule played four years under Joe Paterno and was a three-time Penn State Scholar-Athlete and an Academic All-Big Ten honoree in 1997.  While at Penn State, Rhule earned his Bachelor's of Arts in Political Science. He earned a Master's in Educational Psychology from the University at Buffalo in 2003.

Coaching career

Early coaching career
Following the end of his playing career, Rhule was hired as the linebackers coach for Albright College. After one year at Albright, Rhule had stops at Buffalo, UCLA and Western Carolina before being hired at Temple as a defensive line coach in 2006. Rhule would switch to quarterbacks coach in 2007 before being named Temple's offensive coordinator in 2008.

New York Giants (2012)
After six years as an assistant at Temple, Rhule joined Tom Coughlin's New York Giants in 2012 as the assistant offensive line coach, a season after the Giants won their 4th Super Bowl title. With the Giants, Rhule coached Super Bowl champions like David Diehl, Kevin Boothe, and Chris Snee.

Temple Owls (2013–2016)
On December 17, 2012, Rhule was named the 26th head football coach at Temple, succeeding Steve Addazio who left to become the head coach at Boston College.

In July 2015, Rhule signed a four-year extension with Temple that extended him through the 2021 season. After a tremendous third year with the Owls, this deal was re-negotiated to keep Rhule at the university. He was the target of Mizzou and Syracuse, but chose to remain at Temple.

On September 5, 2015, in front of 69,741 fans, Rhule defeated his alma mater, Penn State, 27–10 for the Owls' first win over the Nittany Lions since 1941.

In his third year as Temple's head coach, Rhule's Temple team went 10–2 in the regular season, winning the American Athletic Conference's East Division and took part in the conference's inaugural championship game. The next season, he took the Owls to their second consecutive championship game, where they won their first conference championship since 1967.

Baylor Bears (2017–2019)

On December 6, 2016, Rhule was named the head football coach at Baylor University, replacing interim head coach Jim Grobe. The Bears finished the 2017 season with a disappointing 1–11 record, which meant Baylor would not qualify for a bowl for the first time since 2009. Baylor finished the 2018 regular season 6–6 and received an invite to the 2018 Texas Bowl, where he led the Bears to a 45–38 victory over the Vanderbilt Commodores to finish the season with a 7–6 record.  The Baylor Bears, under Rhule's leadership, finished the 2019 regular season at 11–1, and ultimately fell to Oklahoma in the Big 12 Championship game and Georgia in the Sugar Bowl. During his tenure at Baylor, Rhule's teams never defeated a ranked team.

Carolina Panthers (2020–2022)

On January 7, 2020, Rhule was hired to become the fifth head coach of the Carolina Panthers.

2020 season

On September 13, 2020, Rhule lost his NFL head coaching debut against the Las Vegas Raiders by a score of 30–34. On September 27, 2020, Rhule got his first career win as an NFL head coach against the Los Angeles Chargers by a score of 21–16. In his first season as head coach, Rhule led the Panthers to a 5–11 record, finishing 3rd in the NFC South. 

Bleacher Report stated following his first year that Rhule "hasn't gotten off to a perfect start in Carolina, but the Panthers appear to be trending in the right direction." Under Rhule's watch, the Panthers defense improved significantly going from allowing the 2nd-most points in 2019 to being #15 in the league in that category in 2020.

2021 season

On September 12, 2021, Rhule led the Panthers to win their first game of the 2021 NFL season by defeating the New York Jets by a score of 19–14. The Panthers started the season 3–0, but ultimately finished with a disappointing 5–12 record. After being just 10–23 in his first two seasons at the helm in Carolina, his job began to be called into question by fans, media, and former Panthers players. Panthers owner David Tepper remained confident that Rhule was laying the foundation for the future.

2022 season

After a 37–15 loss to the San Francisco 49ers and dropping the team to a 1–4 record, Rhule was relieved of his duties, and fired as head coach on October 10, 2022. He finished his tenure with an 11–27 record in two and a half seasons.

Nebraska Cornhuskers (beginning in 2023 season)

On November 26, 2022, Rhule was announced as the head coach of the Nebraska Cornhuskers, one day after the Cornhuskers' final game of the 2022 season.

Head coaching record

College

* Departed Temple for Baylor before bowl game

NFL

Personal life
Rhule is married with three children.

References

External links
 Carolina Panthers profile
 Baylor profile
 Temple profile

1975 births
Living people
Albright Lions football coaches
American football linebackers
Baylor Bears football coaches
Buffalo Bulls football coaches
Carolina Panthers coaches
New York Giants coaches
Penn State Nittany Lions football players
Temple Owls football coaches
UCLA Bruins football coaches
Western Carolina Catamounts football coaches
University at Buffalo alumni
Players of American football from New York City
People from State College, Pennsylvania
Coaches of American football from Pennsylvania
Players of American football from Pennsylvania
Carolina Panthers head coaches